Tacubaya is a station on Lines 1, 7 and 9 of the Mexico City Metro system. It is located in the Miguel Hidalgo borough, west of the city centre. In 2019, the station had a total average ridership of 85,800 passengers per day, making it the fifth busiest station in the network.

Name and pictogram
The station takes its name from the neighborhood it is located in: Tacubaya. The origin of this zone of the city can be traced back to an Aztec settlement, which back then was at the edge of Lake Texcoco. The name Tacubaya is a Spanish barbarism that derived from the Nahuatl Atlacuihuayan, that means "where water joins".

Therefore, the station pictogram represents a water bowl, that also resembles the glyph of the Aztec settlement of Tacubaya found at the Codex Mendoza.

History
Service at this station began on 20 November 1970, when Line 1 was expanded westwards from Juanacatlán to Tacubaya. On 22 August 1985, Metro Tacubaya became a transfer station, when the second stretch of Line 7 was inaugurated, from Auditorio to Tacubaya. In 1988, Line 9 was connected to the station as part of the final stretch of Line 9, inaugurated on 29 August 1988, going from Centro Médico to Tacubaya, thus becoming the western terminus of the line.

According to earlier plans for the metro, Line 9 was supposed to be extended towards Observatorio. This is the reason why on Line 9 platforms of Tacubaya signs stating that the station is a provisional terminal can be seen since its opening in 1988. In 2018, the Sistema de Transporte Colectivo announced plans to complete this expansion from Tacubaya to Observatorio. Mexico City government announced shortly after that no works would be done during 2019; and as of early 2020, works still have not been started.

March 2020 train crash

On March 10, 2020, at about 23:37 local time (05:37 GMT), two trains crashed while both were going towards Observatorio station. According to official reports, 1 person died and 41 were injured, all inside train No. 33; people in train No. 38 were evacuated moments before the crash. Observatorio, Tacubaya and Juanacatlán stations were closed temporarily for repairs. Authorities from the Sistema Transporte Colectivo Metro believe the crash was caused due to a failure in the train systems coupled with a 7-degree slope that propelled train No. 33 for a kilometer (0.62 mi), that occurred after performing a parking maneuver at Observatorio station.

General information
The station was built on many levels, in order to accommodate the connecting lines. It has a maze of long, wide corridors between the lines' platforms, which are equipped with escalators. This station's exits connect with many zones of Tacubaya neighborhood, such as Parque Lira, a local market and the offices of the Miguel Hidalgo borough administration.

Metro Tacubaya has facilities for the handicapped, four cultural displays, as well as a medical module and a cyber center where users can access internet through a computer; both services are free. The mural Del códice al mural by Guillermo Ceniceros can be found inside the station in Line 1 platforms.

The station serves the neighborhood of the same name. It was in this area of Mexico City where the French pastry chef had his shop that was damaged in 1828, an incident that lead to the Pastry War a decade later.

Ridership

Nearby
Parque Lira, public park.
Museo Casa de la Bola, museum.
Museo Nacional de Cartografía, museum of cartography.
Alameda de Tacubaya, public plaza.

Exits

Line 1
Northwest: Castellanos Quinto, Tacubaya
Northeast: Av. Parque Lira, Tacubaya
Southwest: Av. Jalisco and Rufina, Tacubaya
Southeast: Av. Parque Lira, Tacubaya

Line 7
Doctora and Av. Parque Lira, Tacubaya

Line 9
Northwest: Av. Jalisco and Manuel Dublan, Tacubaya
Northeast: Av. Jalisco and Iturbide, Tacubaya
Southeast: Av. Jalisco and Mártires de la Conquista, Tacubaya

Gallery

See also 
 List of Mexico City metro stations
 1975 Mexico City Metro train crash

References

External links 

 

Mexico City Metro Line 1 stations
Mexico City Metro stations in Miguel Hidalgo, Mexico City
Railway stations opened in 1970
1970 establishments in Mexico
Railway stations opened in 1985
1985 establishments in Mexico
Railway stations opened in 1988
1988 establishments in Mexico
Mexico City Metro Line 7 stations
Mexico City Metro Line 9 stations
Accessible Mexico City Metro stations